Burghead was a railway station serving Burghead in the Scottish district of Moray (formerly Elginshire).

History
The branch line from Alves was constructed by the Inverness and Aberdeen Junction Railway (I&AJR). Construction began in January 1862 and the first trains ran on 22 December 1862. Burghead's first station was located on the east foreshore and as well as passenger services provided freight facilities to Burghead harbour.

The I&AJR became part of the Highland Railway in 1865 and in 1892 the Highland company extended the branch line from Burghead to Hopeman. The new station opened on 10 October 1892. The original station continued to handle all freight and the line to the original station became known as the Burghead harbour line.

In 1923 the line became part of the London, Midland and Scottish Railway.  By the end of the 1920s passenger revenue on the line was becoming uneconomic and the last passenger services ran on 12 September 1931.

Despite being closed the station was host to two LMS caravans from 1935 to 1939. A camping coach was also positioned here by the Scottish Region from 1954 to 1963.

Freight service continued to run but on 31 December 1957 the freight service beyond Burghead to Hopeman was withdrawn and in 1966 general freight services were withdrawn from the rest of the branch line resulting in the full closure of Burghead station.  The line continued to by used for delivering grain to Burghead maltings until 1992.  Following the cessation of the grain traffic the line was lifted from the harbour branch to a point south of Burghead.  The line laid abandoned until final closure in 2017 as part of the Aberdeen–Inverness improvement project.

The platforms of the first station are still in place but the new station buildings were destroyed by fire in 2003 and no trace remains of the second station.

References

Railway stations in Great Britain opened in 1862
Railway stations in Great Britain closed in 1966
Disused railway stations in Moray
Former Highland Railway stations